Wojciech Fibak and Sandy Mayer were the defending champions but did not compete that year.

Mike De Palmer and Gary Donnelly won in the final 6–4, 6–3 against Sergio Casal and Emilio Sánchez.

Seeds

  Heinz Günthardt /  Balázs Taróczy (quarterfinals)
  Anders Järryd /  Pavel Složil (quarterfinals)
  Sergio Casal /  Emilio Sánchez (final)
  Mike De Palmer /  Gary Donnelly (champions)

Draw

External links
 1985 Fischer-Grand Prix Doubles draw

Doubles